Ernest Weatherly Greene Jr. (born October 3, 1982), known professionally as Washed Out, is an American singer, songwriter and record producer. Commonly associated with the chillwave genre in the 2010s, Pitchfork dubbed him "the godfather of chillwave".

Life and career
Ernest Weatherly Greene Jr. was born on October 3, 1982, in Perry, Georgia, and currently lives in Atlanta. After earning an undergraduate degree from the University of Georgia, he obtained a Master of Library and Information Science degree but was unable to find a job as a librarian. Greene moved back in with his parents and started producing songs in his bedroom studio, as well as working on recordings of dance music with Bedroom, a local band.  During 2008 he recorded lo-fi rock music under the name Lee Weather, but the following summer he found more success with his new project, Washed Out. He was soon discovered by a number of influential music bloggers after they found his music on his Myspace page. His first recordings have been described as "drowsy, distorted, dance pop-influenced tracks that brought to mind Neon Indian and Memory Tapes".

Greene's first two extended plays were released in August and September 2009. He held his debut New York City performance (his second live show ever) at Santos Party House. He has since performed at the 2010 Pitchfork Music Festival and his song "Feel it All Around" is used as the opening theme for the television series Portlandia.

In April 2011 it was announced that he had been signed to Sub Pop. His debut, Within and Without, then released on July 12, 2011. The album peaked at #26 on the Billboard 200 and #89 on the UK Albums Chart. He was chosen by Battles to perform at the ATP Nightmare Before Christmas festival that they co-curated in December 2011 in Minehead, England.

Washed Out's second album, Paracosm, was released on August 13, 2013. The first single was "It All Feels Right," followed by "Don't Give Up." The same year, "New Theory" from Life of Leisure featured in-background on a scene from The Spectacular Now. In May 2014, he was reporting to be working on a third studio album, but he stated, "I'm figuring out the next step."

On May 19, Washed Out announced dates for his "Get Lost" tour, taking place in July 2017. Subsequently, he released his third studio album, Mister Mellow, on June 30, 2017. The album was produced at Stones Throw Records with the help of Cole M.G.N.

In April 2018, Washed Out released a new single, "Face Up" as part of Adult Swim's Singles Series. The single was later included on his fourth album, Purple Noon (2020). In April 2020, Washed Out released a new single, "Too Late". On June 30, 2020, Washed Out announced that a new album called Purple Noon would be released on August 7, 2020. He also released a new single, "Time to Walk Away".

Musical style 
Washed Out's style has been identified with the chillwave movement. He has said hip hop influences the way he writes songs.

Discography

Studio albums

Extended plays

Singles

Notes

Guest appearances

References

External links
 
 Q&A with Washed Out (a.k.a. Ernest Greene), The Blue Indian, September 1, 2009
 Interview with Ernest Greene, August 2010
Washed out signs with Sub Pop, April 2011
 Washed Out at NPR Music

1982 births
Living people
21st-century American singers
American male singer-songwriters
American synth-pop musicians
Chillwave musicians
Mexican Summer artists
People from Perry, Georgia
Record producers from Georgia (U.S. state)
Sub Pop artists
University of Georgia alumni
University of South Carolina alumni
Dream pop musicians
21st-century American male singers
Singer-songwriters from Georgia (U.S. state)